Herman Sørby Stengel (born 26 August 1995) is a Norwegian footballer who plays as a midfielder for Eliteserien side Strømsgodset. He has previously played for Stabæk and Vålerenga, and has represented his country at youth level.

Club career

Stengel was born in Lørenskog, and grew up in Hokksund, where he played for Hokksund before he joined Stabæk as a youth. He started playing for their senior B team, Stabæk 2, and became the youngest goalscorer ever in the Norwegian Second Division. In May 2010 he scored his first senior goal at the age 14 years and 261 days.

In 2009, Stengel did a trial at Manchester United together with Mats Møller Dæhli, who later joined the club's academy and Sondre Tronstad. In December 2012, Stabæk granted Stengel a week to trial with PSV Eindhoven.

On 2 October 2011, Stengel made his Norwegian Premier League debut, starting the match against Sarpsborg 08. Aged 16 years and 37 days, he became the youngest Stabæk-player to start a match in Tippeligaen, and the then third youngest player in the Norwegian top division.

Stengel became known during the autumn of 2011, as he was a piece of Veigar Páll Gunnarsson's transfer to Vålerenga, which caused great controversy. TV 2 (Norway) revealed on 12 October 2011 that Gunnarsson was transferred to Vålerenga for 1 million NOK, while Vålerenga paid a transfer fee of 4 million NOK for an option for the then 15-year-old footballer Stengel. In February 2012, Stengel stated that he wants to be known as a footballer, not as the guy who was a piece in the controversial football transfer, and that his dream is to play in one of the best leagues in Europe.

After Stabæk was relegated from Tippeligaen in 2012, Stengel was one of the key-players in the young Stabæk-team that finished the 2013 season second in the First Division and won promotion back to Tippeligaen. His contract with Stabæk expired after the season and he joined Vålerenga as a free agent ahead of the 2014 season, signing a four-year contract with the club.

On 20 November 2017, Strømsgodset Toppfotball announced that Stengel had signed a three-year deal from 1 January 2018.

International career
Stengel scored six goals in twenty-three matches for Norwegian under-15 to under-17 between 2010 and 2012.

Career statistics

Club

References

1995 births
Living people
People from Lørenskog
People from Øvre Eiker
Norwegian footballers
Norway youth international footballers
Stabæk Fotball players
Vålerenga Fotball players
Strømsgodset Toppfotball players
Eliteserien players
Norwegian First Division players
Association football midfielders
Sportspeople from Viken (county)